Pierre Jacques Joatton (20 July 1930 − 22 November 2013) was a French Roman Catholic bishop.

Ordained to the priesthood on 29 June 1957, Joatton was named bishop of the Roman Catholic Diocese of Saint-Étienne, France on 20 April 1988 and retired on 28 June 2006.

References

1930 births
2013 deaths
Clergy from Lyon
21st-century Roman Catholic bishops in France
20th-century Roman Catholic bishops in France